Kruševo is a town in North Macedonia. In Macedonian the name means the 'place of pear trees'. It is the highest town in North Macedonia and one of the highest in the Balkans, situated at an altitude of over 1350 m (4429 feet) above sea level. The town of Kruševo is the seat of Kruševo Municipality. It is located in the western part of the country, overlooking the region of Pelagonia, 33 and 53 km from the nearby cities of Prilep and Bitola, respectively.

Name
The name of the town in other Balkan languages is:

 or 

 or

History

Medieval
Initially part of the Byzantine Empire, the area was conquered by the First Bulgarian Empire in the 9th century to be conquered again by the Byzantium in the 11th century. The region came shortly under the rule of the short-lived Principality of Prilep of Prince Marko (r. 1371 - 1395), a successor state of the Serbian Empire (1346–1371) where the father of Župan Vukašin Mrnjavčević (co-ruler of King Stefan Uroš V) held the region. The principality and region came under Ottoman Turkish rule in 1395.

Ottoman rule

A large part of the Macedonian population in Kruševo originate from Lazaropole and descend from Mijaks, a Macedonian sub-group who settled in the town alongside the Aromanians by the middle of the eighteenth century. Aromanians settled in Kruševo in addition to Orthodox Albanian refugees often in groups of families and led by a priest fleeing the 18th century socio-political and economic crises in what is now southern Albania. Orthodox Albanians arrived from  Vithkuq and the Opar region while local Kruševo traditions also relate that other families arrived from Korçë and the villages of Polenë, Dardhë, and Mborje. 

In the 19th century, Kruševo grew as a commercial center with connections throughout the Balkans and beyond. Local merchants such as the Nitsiotas brothers and five other companies were active in Vienna. Orthodox Albanians from Moscopole which migrated in the beginning of the 19th century to Kruševo would found the so called Ohtul di Arbinesh (Hill of the Albanians) neighborhood. This community would soon assimilate into the Aromanian population of the city. In the 1860s a Bulgarian municipality and Bulgarian school were established the city. Subsequently, a Bulgarian girls school was opened and it operated simultaneously with the Greek schools in the town. A Romanian school started functioning in Kruševo in 1876. In the early 20th century, Kruševo was a small town in Manastir Vilayet with a mixed population of 4,950 Bulgarians, 4,000 Vlachs (Aromanians) and 400 Christian Albanians, according to Bulgarian geographer Vasil Kanchov's statistics. Due to intermarriage with locals, at the onset of the twentieth century few in the small local Orthodox Albanian community spoke Albanian. A neighbourhood inhabited by Aromanians in Kruševo still bears the name Arbineš meaning Albanians in the Aromanian language. Per Bulgarian teacher Nikola Kirov, who was native to the town, most of the Aromanians, as well as the Orthodox Albanians were in fact (sic) Grecomans. During the Ilinden Uprising in 1903 the rebels proclaimed a short lived Kruševo Republic. Its leader, Nikola Karev, created a council of Kruševo's  notable citizens,  with twenty members from each of the town's three major ethnic groups (Slavs, Vlachs, and Orthodox Albanians). Because the uprising was suppressed, the city was almost completely destroyed by the Ottoman army. One of the most important points in the Ilinden uprising was the declaration of the "Manifesto of Kruševo". It called for all the people of Macedonia regardless of their nationality and religion to fight together against the Ottoman Empire. In the area there is a monument called Mečkin Kamen (Bear's Stone). This was the place where Pitu Guli's band (cheta) was trying to defend the town of Kruševo from the Turkish troops coming from Bitola. The band and their leader (voivode) are remembered as heroic defenders of Kruševo and the surrounding villages.

Kingdom of Yugoslavia

Demographics

As of the 2021 census, the town of Kruševo has 4,104 inhabitants and the ethnic composition was the following:

Macedonians 3,053 (74.4%)
Aromanians 866 (21.1%)
Persons from whom data are taken from administrative sources 146 (3.6%)
Serbs 10 (0.2%)
Albanians 9 (0.2%)
Bosniaks 1 (0.0%)
others 19 (0.5%)

The official languages of the town are Macedonian and Aromanian. Kruševo is the only locality where Aromanian has any kind of official status. All other forms of recognition of the language in the world represent general, nationwide recognition in Albania and North Macedonia.

The religious composition of the town was the following:

Orthodox Christians, 5,275 (99.0%)
others, 55 (1.0%)

Features
Kruševo is a mountainous town. Kruševo is known for its 19th-century Ottoman architecture. The town has old and more recent houses built in the style of old Macedonian architecture.

It is home to Mečkin Kamen, a historical landmark which marks the spot of the uprising of 1903. On 2 August every year, it is one of the two sites of the traditional Macedonian Day of the Republic celebrations, which are attended by leading Macedonian political leaders.

Kruševo is also home to Makedonium monument, dedicated to the Ilinden Uprising and the Kruševo Republic and many museums of the Ilinden Uprising.

The town's galleries include an exhibit of 19th century icons and a memorial to Macedonian painter Nikola Martinovski who was born in this town.

Because of its elevation, Kruševo is one of North Macedonia's winter sports destinations. Local football club FK Pitu Guli was named after a local revolutionary leader and plays in the Macedonian Second League (East Division).

"Ethno-Town Project"

There is a project called "Kruševo ethno-town", supported by the Ministry of Culture of North Macedonia, which was developed by a small group of enthusiasts. According to that project, Kruševo shall look like a town from the beginning of the 20th century where it was one of the centers of the Ilinden Uprising in 1903, that led to the creation of the so-called Kruševo Republic. People will be dressed like Ottoman soldiers and IMARO revolutionaries. The project aims to make Kruševo a main tourist destination in five years.

Notable people
 Toše Proeski, famous singer throughout the Balkans
 Nikola Karev, politician, revolutionary leader
 Pitu Guli, revolutionary leader
 Vasil Iljoski, writer
 Nikola Martinoski, painter
 Taki Hrisik, composer, musical pedagogue
 Ilija Najdoski, footballer, European Cup champion
 Taki Fiti, academician, former president of the Macedonian Academy of Sciences and Arts, politician, minister of finance, author
 Nicolae Batzaria, writer, Ottoman Minister of Public Works and Commerce
 Alexandros Svolos, prominent Greek legal expert, president of the Political Committee of National Liberation, a Resistance-based government during the Axis Occupation of Greece.
 Mencha Karnicheva, revolutionary 
 Nikola Gabrovski, military figure
 Yiannis Boutaris, businessman, politician, former mayor of Thessaloniki.

Architecture of Kruševo

References

External links

Cities in North Macedonia
Ski areas and resorts in North Macedonia
Aromanian settlements in North Macedonia
Kruševo Municipality